Pix was an Australian pictorial magazine, issued weekly from 1938 to 1972 and published by Associated Newspapers Limited in Sydney, Australia.

History 
The first edition of Pix Magazine was published in January 1938, and publication continued until the magazine was merged with the Australian People magazine in 1972. Pix was notable for its irreverent content, its focus on Australian lifestyle and popular culture, and for the inclusion of pin-up style photographs of Australian women. The editors of the magazine regularly held pin-up girl competitions, and encouraged local women to submit photographs of themselves wearing swimwear for a chance to win prizes. In addition to providing a distraction for Australian servicemen during the Second World War, the Pix magazine pin-up is thought to have played a role in the construction of the ideal of the Australian "beach girl" as a representation of Australian womanhood.

Digitisation 
Pix Magazine has been digitised by the State Library of New South Wales and is available at Trove hosted by National Library of Australia.

See also 
 List of magazines in Australia

References

External links 
 Pix Magazine at Trove

Magazines published in Sydney
Magazines established in 1938
Magazines disestablished in 1972
Defunct magazines published in Australia